Griswoldia is a genus of southern African false wolf spiders. It was first described by A. S. Dippenaar-Schoeman and Rudy Jocqué in 1997, and it has only been found in South Africa.

Species
 it contains twelve species:
G. acaenata (Griswold, 1991) – South Africa
G. disparilis (Lawrence, 1952) – South Africa
G. leleupi (Griswold, 1991) – South Africa
G. meikleae (Griswold, 1991) – South Africa
G. melana (Lawrence, 1938) – South Africa
G. natalensis (Lawrence, 1938) – South Africa
G. punctata (Lawrence, 1942) – South Africa
G. robusta (Simon, 1898) – South Africa
G. sibyna (Griswold, 1991) – South Africa
G. transversa (Griswold, 1991) – South Africa
G. urbensis (Lawrence, 1942) – South Africa
G. zuluensis (Lawrence, 1938) – South Africa

See also
 List of Zoropsidae species

References

Further reading

Zoropsidae genera
Spiders of South Africa